The United Presbyterian Church in Brazil was organized on September 10, 1978 as the National Federation of Presbyterian Churches, it separated from the Presbyterian Church of Brazil. In 1983, the church adopted the current name. Its headquarters is in Victoria (Espirito Santo, ES). The church is a supporter of women in the ministry.

Structure 
In January 2011, the church had 3,466 members in 48 churches, distributed in eight presbyteries:
 Presbytery in Victoria
 Presbytery in St.Paul
 Presbytery North Central ES
 New River Presbytery
 Presbytery of Jundiai
 Presbytery of the Savior
 Presbytery of Erasmo Baga
 Presbytery of the City of Rio de Janeiro

Theology 
Member of the World Communion of Reformed Churches, Latin American Council of Churches, Alliance of Presbyterian and Reformed Churches in Latin America and the national Council of Christian Churches in Brazil.

References

External links 
www.ipu.org.br Denominational website

Presbyterian denominations in South America
Protestant denominations
Members of the World Communion of Reformed Churches